Magomed Alibulatovich Ankalaev  (born 2 June 1992) is a Russian professional mixed martial artist, who currently competes in the Light Heavyweight division of the Ultimate Fighting Championship (UFC).  As of January 24, 2023, he is #2 in the UFC light heavyweight rankings.

Ankalaev is the former Light heavyweight champion of World Fighting Championship Akhmat. He is also the winner of 2016 Akhmat FC Light Heavyweight Grand Prix.

Early life
Ankalaev was born on June 2, 1992 in Makhachkala, Russia in the family of Avar descent. Ankalaev first began training in Greco-Roman Wrestling for one year whilst he was a student at the Dagestan State University, where he graduated in the sport faculty. At that time he also competed in combat sambo, where he was honoured with the title of Master of Sports in the discipline. Ankalaev was compelled at the idea of transitioning to MMA, because of the similarity between MMA and combat sambo. Ankalaev then became the Russian and World champion in amateur MMA. Ankalaev was also named the 2015 Mixed Martial Artist of Russia by the Russian MMA federation. Ankalaev is a devout Muslim.

Mixed martial arts career

Amateur MMA & combat sambo career 
In December 2013, during the WMMAA's World Cup in Baku, Azerbaijan, Ankalaev ends up winning the gold-medal by beating Kazakhstani Rustam Malaev in the finals.

In June 2014, at Russian MMA Championship, Ankalaev ends up beating both of Fedor Emelianenko's students like, Valentin Moldavsky in semi-final, and Vadim Nemkov in the finals; thereby qualifying for WMMAA Championship in Minsk, Belarus. In September of the same year, at WMMAA's World Championship hosted by the city of Minsk, Ankalaev manages to win only silver medal for his effort.

In March 2015, Ankalaev wins the finals of MMA Cup of Dagestan, by beating Muslim Magomedov. Barely a month later, Magomed Ankalaev wins the Russian Cup, by again beating his rival, Muslim Magomedov in the final. One month later, at Russian MMA Championship, Ankalaev beats his old rival Valentin Moldavsky via split decision in the final, to win the gold medal. In November 2015, Ankalaev won the gold-medal in WMMAA World Championship held in Prague, Czech Republic.

In May 2016, Anakalaev won the Russian MMA Championship, by beating Magomed Shakhrudinov in tourney finals. In, November of the same year, Ankalaev wins the Combat Sambo Cup of Dagestan. Few weeks later, in the same month, Ankalaev won gold-medal in WMMAA's Championship held in Macau, China.

Early career 
Ankalaev made his professional debut on 18 January 2014, at Oplot Challenge 96, where he beat Vasily Babich of Ukraine by majority decision. In December 2015, Anakalaev wins MMA Super Cup of Russia, by beating Nadyr Bulkadarov in the pro exhibition fight.  At Akhmat FC he was the winner 2016 Akhmat FC Light Heavyweight Grand Prix.  After winning the Chechen MMA promotion World Fighting Championship Akhmat's world title he signed with the UFC in October 2017.

Ultimate Fighting Championship
Ankalaev made his promotional debut against Paul Craig in March 2018 at UFC Fight Night: Werdum vs. Volkov. Ankalaev dominated the fight for the majority of the bout, winning with clean striking, takedowns and top control; Ankalaev had Craig badly hurt with a body kick in the first round. However, in the last five seconds of round three, Craig caught Ankalaev with a triangle choke, giving him his first professional loss at exactly 4:59 of round three.

Rebounding from this loss, Ankalaev was scheduled to fight Marcin Prachnio on September 15, 2018, at UFC Fight Night: Hunt vs. Oleinik. After a slow start, Ankalaev landed a right hook counter that knocked down Prachnio, who then got up, only to then be hit with a head kick and follow up punch which rendered him unconscious. The knockout earned Ankalaev his first UFC win and Performance of the Night award.

Ankalaev was expected to face Darko Stošić on February 23, 2019, at UFC Fight Night 145. However, Stošić pulled out of the fight on January 23 citing injury. Ankalaev instead faced promotional newcomer Klidson Abreu. Ankalaev won the fight by unanimous decision.

Ankalaev faced Dalcha Lungiambula on November 9, 2019, at UFC Fight Night 163. He won the fight via knockout in the third round. This fight earned him the Performance of the Night award.

Ankalaev faced Ion Cuțelaba on February 29, 2020, at UFC Fight Night 169. He won via a technical knockout in the first round. The win was not without controversy as referee Kevin MacDonald stopped the bout believing Cuțelaba was out on his feet while still standing, which Cuțelaba immediately protested. The stoppage was heavily criticized by media outlets, fighters, and fans as being premature. Consequently, the Virginia Department of Professional and Occupation Regulation (DPOR) reviewed the fight, denying Cuțelaba's appeal to overturn the loss.

A rematch against Cuțelaba was expected to take place on August 15, 2020, at UFC 252. Cuțelaba then pulled out on August 11 after testing positive for COVID-19 and the bout was rescheduled for UFC Fight Night 175. However, the day of the event, it was announced the fight was once again cancelled after Cuțelaba tested positive for COVID-19 for a second time.  They eventually faced each other at UFC 254. Ankalaev won the fight via knockout in round one. This win earned him the Performance of the Night award.

Ankalev faced Nikita Krylov on February 27, 2021, at UFC Fight Night 186. He won the fight via unanimous decision.

Ankalaev was scheduled to face Volkan Oezdemir on September 4, 2021, at UFC Fight Night 191. The fight was later moved to UFC 267 in Abu Dhabi on October 30, 2021. He won the bout via unanimous decision.

Ankalaev faced Thiago Santos on March 12, 2022, at UFC Fight Night 203. He won the bout via unanimous decision.

Ankalaev next faced Anthony Smith on July 30, 2022, at UFC 277. He won the fight via technical knockout in the second round.

Title contention 
Ankalaev fought Jan Błachowicz for the vacant UFC Light Heavyweight Championship on December 10, 2022 at UFC 282.  The fight ended in a controversial split draw. 23 out of 25 media members scored the fight as a win for Ankalaev.

Championships and accomplishments

Amateur MMA/combat sambo 

 World MMA Association (WMMAA)
  World Cup 
  World Championship 
  World Championship  
  World Championship 
 Russian MMA Union
  Russian MMA Championship 
  Moscow Open Cup 
  Super Cup of Russia 
  MMA Cup of Dagestan 
  Russian Cup: North Caucasian Federal District  
  Russian MMA Championship 
  Russian MMA Championship 
 Combat Sambo
  Combat Sambo Cup of Dagestan

Pro mixed martial arts 
Ultimate Fighting Championship
Performance of the Night (Three times) .
 Second longest win streak in UFC Light Heavyweight history (9)
World Fighting Championship Akhmat
WFCA Light Heavyweight Champion (One time)
One successful title defense
2016 Akhmat FC Light Heavyweight World Grand Prix Tournament Winner
Russian MMA Union
MMA Super Cup of Russia 2015

Mixed martial arts record

|- 
|Draw
|align=center|
|Jan Błachowicz
|Draw (split)
|UFC 282
|
|align=center|5
|align=center|5:00
|Las Vegas, Nevada, United States
|
|-
|Win
|align=center|18–1
|Anthony Smith
|TKO (punches)
|UFC 277
|
|align=center|2
|align=center|3:09
|Dallas, Texas, United States
|
|-
|Win
|align=center|17–1
|Thiago Santos
|Decision (unanimous)
|UFC Fight Night: Santos vs. Ankalaev
|
|align=center|5
|align=center|5:00
|Las Vegas, Nevada, United States
|
|-
|Win
|align=center|16–1
|Volkan Oezdemir 
|Decision (unanimous)
|UFC 267 
|
|align=center|3
|align=center|5:00
|Abu Dhabi, United Arab Emirates
|   
|-
|Win
|align=center|15–1
|Nikita Krylov
|Decision (unanimous)
|UFC Fight Night: Rozenstruik vs. Gane 
|
|align=center|3
|align=center|5:00
|Las Vegas, Nevada, United States
| 
|-
|Win
|align=center|14–1
|Ion Cuțelaba
|KO (punches) 
|UFC 254
|
|align=center|1
|align=center|4:19
|Abu Dhabi, United Arab Emirates
|
|-
|Win
|align=center|13–1
|Ion Cuțelaba
|TKO (head kicks and punches)
|UFC Fight Night: Benavidez vs. Figueiredo 
|
|align=center|1
|align=center|0:38
|Norfolk, Virginia, United States
|
|-
|Win
|align=center|12–1
|Dalcha Lungiambula
|KO (front kick and punch)
|UFC Fight Night: Magomedsharipov vs. Kattar 
|
|align=center|3
|align=center|0:29
|Moscow, Russia
|
|-
|Win
|align=center|11–1
|Klidson Abreu
|Decision (unanimous)
|UFC Fight Night: Błachowicz vs. Santos 
|
|align=center|3
|align=center|5:00
|Prague, Czech Republic
|
|-
|Win
|align=center|10–1
|Marcin Prachnio
|KO (head kick and punches)
|UFC Fight Night: Hunt vs. Oleinik 
|
|align=center|1
|align=center|3:09
|Moscow, Russia
|
|-
|Loss
|align=center|9–1
|Paul Craig
|Submission (triangle choke)
|UFC Fight Night: Werdum vs. Volkov 
|
|align=center|3
|align=center|4:59
|London, England
|
|-
|Win
|align=center|9–0
|Celso Ricardo da Silva
|KO (punches)
|WFCA 43
|
|align=center|1
|align=center|1:11
|Grozny, Russia
|
|-
|Win
|align=center|8–0
|Wagner Prado
|KO (punches)
|WFCA 38
|
|align=center|1
|align=center|3:33
|Grozny, Russia
|
|-
| Win
| align=center|7–0
| Maxim Grishin
| TKO (punches)
| WFCA 30
|
|align=center|4
|align=center|1:13
|Grozny, Russia
|
|-
| Win
| align=center| 6–0
| Artur Astakhov
| Decision (unanimous)
| WFCA 23
| 
| align=center| 3
| align=center| 5:00
| Grozny, Russia
|
|-
| Win
| align=center| 5–0
| Lloyd Marshbanks
| TKO (submission to punches)
| WFCA 18
| 
| align=center| 1
| align=center| 0:15
| Grozny, Russia
|
|-
| Win
| align=center| 4–0
| Nadir Bulkhadarov 
| TKO (punches)
| Supercup of Russia 2015
| 
| align=center| 1
| align=center| 4:45
| Chelyabinsk, Russia
|
|-
| Win
| align=center| 3–0
| Döwletjan Ýagşymyradow
| Decision (unanimous)
| Oplot Challenge 103
| 
| align=center| 3
| align=center| 5:00
| Moscow, Russia
| 
|-
| Win
| align=center| 2–0
| Strahinja Denić 
| Decision (unanimous)
| Tesla Fighting Championship 4
| 
| align=center| 3
| align=center| 5:00
| Pančevo, Serbia
| 
|-
| Win
| align=center| 1–0
| Vasily Babich
| Decision (majority)
| Oplot Challenge 96
| 
| align=center| 3
| align=center| 5:00
| Kharkiv, Ukraine
|
|-
|}

See also
 List of current UFC fighters
 List of male mixed martial artists

References

External links
 
 

1992 births
Dagestani mixed martial artists
Living people
Sportspeople from Makhachkala
Russian male mixed martial artists
Russian sambo practitioners
Light heavyweight mixed martial artists
Avar people
Ultimate Fighting Championship male fighters
Mixed martial artists utilizing sambo
Mixed martial artists utilizing Greco-Roman wrestling
Russian Muslims